Century High School is located in Santa Ana, California.  It is one of the smallest campuses in Orange County, built to house 1500 students.
It was built in 1989. Its mascot is the Centurion, and the school colors are blue, silver, and green.

Century's current administration consists of one school principal (Nata Shin) and two assistant principals, Mr. Scott Michael, and Ms. Anne Harper.

Student body
The school's student body is largely homogeneous and reflects the Latino ethnic makeup of the surrounding community. It is composed of roughly 93% Hispanic, 5% Asian, 2% Caucasian, 0.5% African American, 0.3% other and mixed and includes 7 different languages spoken. Student life can be seen on the morning broadcast that the school produces every day. 

The school is also home to many clubs and organizations such as the NJROTC (but is housed at Santa Ana High School due to the low number of participants from Century High School), Mock Trial, Polynesian Dance Team, Junior Varsity and Co-ed Varsity Cheer-leading teams, a Marching Band, Concert, & Jazz Band, Color Guard and Drum Line groups, Orchestra musicians, Woman's Chorus and Chamber Singers, and the TEACH and e-Business Academy, which is a competitive program and have won district, county, state, and nationwide competitions. Their music groups (band, choir, etc.) constantly achieve awards every year.

Sports

Century High School athletics include: football, basketball, soccer, Polynesian, tennis, track and field, cross country, volleyball, softball, baseball, wrestling and some smaller branches of physical education such as dance, Pep Squad, NJROTC, colorguard. Century's Pep Squad and Colorguard members are recognized for their achievements in National competition and for their spirit and motivation. Some famous athletes include:

Academics

Century High School is a comprehensive high school offering a full range of a-g courses necessary for UC and Cal State acceptance.  Within the last two years, CST scores have gone higher than expected and have improved; however, not enough to keep the school off of the states list of persistently low performing schools.  The challenges faced by students and faculty are almost insurmountable, yet each year students come back to find dedicated and caring faculty who meet these obstacles head on.  In 2014, Century received a six-year WASC accreditation, almost unheard of for school the federal government considers to not be meeting its AYP.  Below is a sample of coursework offered at Century High School:

-Math-
Algebra 1 (College Prep, Standard, and Honors)
Geometry (College Prep, Standard, and Honors)
Algebra 2 (College Prep, Standard, and Honors)
Probability and Statistics  (Standard, and AP)
Math Analysis (Standard, and Honors)
Calculus AB (AP)

-English-
English 1-2 (College Prep, and Honors)
English 3-4 (College Prep, and Honors)
English 5-6 (College Prep, Honors)
English 7-8 (College Prep, Honors)
English Language and Composition (AP 11th Grade)
English Literature and Composition (AP 12th Grade)

-Science-
Earth Science (Standard)
Biology (College Prep, Standard, Honors and AP)
Chemistry (College Prep, Standard, Honors and AP)
Physics (Standard, Honors and AP)
Human Anatomy and Physiology (Standard)

-History-
World Geography and College Career Planning (M.U.N optional)
World History (MUN, Honors and AP)
American History (MUN, Honors and AP)
American Government and Politics (MUN, Honors and AP)
Economics (College Prep, and AP)

-Arts-
Marching Band, Concert Band, Jazz Band, Choir, Art, Theater, etc.

-Extra curricular-
NJROTC, MUN, Broadcasting, Journalism, United Student Body (USB), Office Aide, Sports, etc.

Notable alumni
 Hebron Fangupo played defensive tackle for the USC Trojans and BYU Cougars and played in the NFL for the Pittsburgh Steelers, Seattle Seahawks, Kansas City Chiefs, and the Washington Redskins. He is the defensive line coach for Snow College and the Utah Tech Trailblazers(formerly Dixie State.)

References

External links
Century High School website
Century High School SAUSD Page

High schools in Santa Ana, California
School buildings completed in 1989
Public high schools in California
1989 establishments in California